Fiji Prime Minister's XIII, or sometimes informally referred to as the Fiji PM's XIII, is the name of a representative rugby league team, comprising Fijian players from the Fiji National Rugby League. Established in 2019, the team is selected to play an annual fixture against Australian Prime Minister's XIII in Fiji at the end of the rugby league season.

History
From 2005 to the 2018, the Australian Prime Minister's XIII side played an annual fixture against the PNG Prime Minister's XIII in Papua New Guinea. On 12 March 2019, the NRL announced that the Australian PM's XIII side would play the Fiji Prime Minister's XIII for the first time.

The first game between the two will be played at Suva's ANZ National Stadium, with the Fijian side comprising players from the Fiji National Rugby League competition.

Results

2019

Players

Captains
Ratu Luke Nadurutalo (2019)

Coaches
Brandon Costin (2019–present)

See also

Fiji national rugby league team
PNG Prime Minister's XIII
Prime Minister's XIII

References

Fiji national rugby league team
National rugby league teams
Rugby clubs established in 2019